Adrian Lowe is a leg amputee Australian Paralympic athlete.  At the 1988 Seoul Games, he won two gold medals in the Men's 4 × 100 m Relay A2A4-7 and Men's 4 × 400 m Relay A2A4-7 events, and three silver medals in the Men's 100 m A4A9, Men's 200 m A4A9, and Men's 400 m A4A9 events.

Lowe was originally interested in competing swimming but was moved to athletics after 1987 Australian National Amputee Games. He was coached by Colin Wright at the Rotary Athletics Field in Chatswood, New South Wales. 

Lowe was born with a congenital deformity and at the age of four his right leg was amputated. He was 16 at the time of the 1988 Seoul Games and attended Fort Street High School in Petersham, New South Wales. During the Games, he shaved his head leaving a V for victory mohawk hairstyle.

References

External links 
 

Paralympic athletes of Australia
Athletes (track and field) at the 1988 Summer Paralympics
Paralympic gold medalists for Australia
Paralympic silver medalists for Australia
Living people
Medalists at the 1988 Summer Paralympics
Sprinters with limb difference
Athletes from Sydney
Year of birth missing (living people)
Australian amputees
Paralympic medalists in athletics (track and field)
Australian male sprinters
Paralympic sprinters